Papal visit to the United Kingdom may refer to:

Pope John Paul II's visit to the United Kingdom, 1982
Pope Benedict XVI's visit to the United Kingdom, 2010